Nkem Okocha is a Nigerian social entrepreneur and activist who founded Mamamoni, a FinTech social enterprise that empowers poor rural and urban slum women with free vocational skills and mobile loans. She is the 2016 winner of the LEAP Africa Social Innovators Programme (SIP) by Union Bank of Nigeria.

Early life and education
Okocha was born and raised in Lagos, Nigeria. She started her tertiary education at Auchi Polytechnic and later proceeded to Lagos State University where she earned a bachelor's degree in banking and finance and received a certificate in entrepreneurship from the Tony Elumelu Entrepreneurship Programme. She also has a certificate in business and entrepreneurship from Northwestern University.

Career
Inspired by her widowed mum's struggle to feed and educate the family, she founded Mamamoni, a social enterprise that is addressing community transformation by empowering women to carry on small businesses. She is very passionate about lifting women out of poverty, and her company aims to break the cycle of poverty in Nigeria. Since 2013, she has impacted and empowered over 4,000 women in several rural/urban slum communities and given out over 100 micro-loans. Before starting her company, she worked as a customer service representative for Intercontinental Bank, now Access Bank plc. She went further to become the managing director at Novine Koncept Ventures before starting Mamamoni.

References 

Living people
Nigerian businesspeople
Lagos State University alumni
Year of birth missing (living people)